Samir Trambakrao Kunawar is a member of the 13th Maharashtra Legislative Assembly. He represents the Hinganghat Assembly Constituency. He belongs to the Bharatiya Janata Party Kunawar had contested the same seat as independent in 2009, losing by a narrow margin. Kunawar's election victory, with the largest margin in the district has resulted in BJP winning two seats in Wardha district for the first time ever. In 2006, P
Kunawar was BJP candidate for the Wardha-Chandrapur local bodies constituency elections to the Maharashtra Legislative Council.

Early life 

Before joining politics, Kunawar was a member of the Rashtriya Sway Sewak organization from 1984 to 1990. Dedicated his life to protecting cows. To prevent the Killing and illegal selling of cows, Kunawar established "Gau rakshak" organization.

In 1996, Kunawar became a director of agricultural produce market Committee, Hinganghat (Krushi Utpanna Bazar Samiti). Later, in 1998 he was appointed as a chairman for the same committee.

He was elected as the president of Hinganghat Nagar Parishad in 2001.

In 2013, Kunawar helped around 3500 families who were affected by a heavy rainfall that took place in Hinganghat by providing groceries, editable oil, and grains full of 5 tractors for a month. It also helped some of the families to build their houses in Hinganghat.

Political career 

After his phenomenal win from Hinganghat constituency. He did many developmental work in Samudrapur, Selu and Hinganghat.

◾ 2015 - 2016

1. Done road constructions, road repairing in Samudrapur Taluka under District Annual Planning (Jilha varshik Yojna)

2. Built a proper drainage system in many wards of Hinganghat taluka including Sant Dnynedhwar ward, Sant Tukdoji ward, Mahavir Ward, Gadge baba ward, Nishanpura ward, Swami Vivekanand ward, Central ward, Gautam ward, Bhagat singh ward, Shastri ward, Nehru ward, Indira Gandhi ward and Sant Kabir Ward.

3. Electrification and Shifting of transformers in Central ward.

4. Beautification of the garden in Mahavir ward.

◾ 2016 - 2017

1. Construction of bridge between Hinganghat to Dhaba Waghdi on Wana river in Wardha District.

2. Repair of Nachangaon - Devli - Vaygaon - Hinganghat road.

3. Repair of Malegaon - Aamgaon - Hingani - Shivangaon - Kelkshar road in Wardha District.

4. Reconstruction of Vadner to Radegaon road.

Also fixed & reconstructed many roads and built many bridges in Samudrapur, Selu and Hinganghat Taluka.

5. Built a common hall for social programs in Salamnagar Chanki of Hinganghat taluka.

6. Built protection walls in Khadki of Hinganghat taluka.

7. Construction of shed and roads of cemeteries also did the beautification of cemeteries in all three talukas of his constituency.

8. Built gram panchayat bhavans in his constituency under District Annual Planning. (जिल्ला वार्षिक योजना)

9. Construction and deepening of cement canals under all three panchayat samitis under "जल युक्त शिवार अभियान"

10. Also constructed many roads under " मुख्यमंत्री ग्राम सडक योजना" in his constituency

11. Water supply for people under "मुख्यमंत्री मंत्री पेय जल कार्यक्रम" for Aajansara, Hiwara, Shegavkund and Dongargaon of Hinganghat Jilha Parishad.

◾List of approved works in 2016 - 2017 under Pilgrimage Development Program.

   
1. Development of Shri. Nagaji Maharaj temple, Pardi, Hinganghat.

2. Development of Shri. Rudreshwar temple, Pohna, Hinganghat.

3. Development of Shri. Bhavani mata temple, Sakurli, Samudrapur.

4. Development of Shri. Krushna Viththal Rukhmai temple, Narayanpur, Samudrapur.

5. Development of Shri Aabaji Maharaj temple, Junona, Selu.

◾ 2017 - 2018

1. Hearse van for Hinganghat Nagar Parishad.

2. Construction of public hall and built many public toilets in Rani Durgavati putla area.

3. Bore well in many wards of Hinganghat including 
 Sant Kabir Ward. 
 Sant Tukdoji Ward. 
 Swami Vivekanand Ward.
 Sant Dnyaneshwar Ward.

◾  Health centres under developmental programs.

1. Primary health centre in Kora, Samudrapur.

2. Construction of the main building of sub health centre in Khapri, Samudrapur.

3. Construction of main building of sub health centre in Kajalsara, Hinganghat.

◾Approved works in 2017- 2018 under Pilgrimage development program.

1. Development of Shri. Rudreshwar temple, Pohna, Hinganghat.

2 Development of Shri. Nagaji Maharaj temple, Pardi, Hinganghat.

3. Development of Shri. Ram temple, Mandgaon, Samudrapur.

4. Development of Shri. Krushna Viththal Rukhmai temple, Narayan Nagar, Samudrapur.

Samadhan Shibir ( समाधान शिबीर) 

Kunawar had initiated the 'Samadhan Shibir' in his constituency. These shibirs were held for the relief of common people. The concept of this initiative was to reach the government's schemes to the doorsteps of people. On his work, Chief Minister of Maharashtra, Devendra Fadanvis congratulated Kunawar for creating a record in Maharashtra for spreading awareness about 18 government schemes and satisfying the queries asked by around 36,000 people throughout these Shibirs. Fadanvis also quoted him as "Karya Samrat" (कार्य सम्राट) for his developmental work. He also urged all the MLAs of Maharashtra to follow the footsteps of Kunawar for holding these shibirs.

References

Maharashtra MLAs 2014–2019
People from Wardha district
Year of birth missing (living people)
Living people
Marathi politicians
Bharatiya Janata Party politicians from Maharashtra
Members of the Maharashtra Legislative Council